A Franco-Polish Alliance was formed in 1524 between the king of France Francis I and the king of Poland Sigismund I.

Francis I was looking for allies in Central Europe to create a balance against the power of Habsburg Emperor Charles V. Queen Bona Sforza, the Italian wife of Sigismund, was instrumental in promoting the alliance, with the objective of recovering sovereignty of Milan. Sigismund himself was motivated by such an alliance because Charles V was getting closer to Russia, thus threatening Poland on two fronts.

The negotiations were handled by Antonio Rincon in 1524, who was then followed by Jerome Laski. Through the agreement, the son of Francis, Henry, Duke of Orléans, was to marry a daughter of Sigismund I, and Sigismund's eldest son was to marry a daughter of Francis I. According to the same agreement, Sigismund was supposed to support Francis' efforts at reconquering Milan to which Sigismund had some right through his earlier marriage with Bona Sforza. The alliance was effectively signed in 1524.

The agreement fell through, however, when Francis I was vanquished by Charles V at the Battle of Pavia in 1525. When Francis again looked for Central European allies after 1526, he would look at Hungary instead and finally formed a Franco–Hungarian alliance with King Zapolya in 1528.

See also
 Foreign alliances of France

References

16th-century military alliances
Treaties of the Kingdom of France
Treaties of the Kingdom of Poland (1385–1569)
Military alliances involving France
Military alliances involving Poland
Francis I of France
1524 in France
1524 in Poland
1524 treaties
France–Poland military relations